Colin MacLean Sinclair (born 1 December 1947) is a Scottish former professional footballer who played in the Scottish Football League for Raith Rovers and Dunfermline Athletic, and in the English Football League for Darlington, Hereford United and Newport County. A forward, he made more than 300 League appearances in all, and ended his career where it had begun, with Scottish junior club Linlithgow Rose.

Sinclair was a member of the Darlington "Dream Team" selected in 2003 via a competition in the club's match programme, as part of the "Farewell to Feethams" celebrations when the club left its longtime home ground.

After retiring from football he went on to develop a successful career in both the licensed and hotel trades from his base in Linlithgow.

References

1947 births
Living people
Footballers from Edinburgh
Scottish footballers
Association football forwards
Raith Rovers F.C. players
Darlington F.C. players
Hereford United F.C. players
Dunfermline Athletic F.C. players
Newport County A.F.C. players
Scottish Junior Football Association players
Scottish Football League players
English Football League players
Linlithgow Rose F.C. players
Scotland youth international footballers